Environmental engineering science (EES) is a multidisciplinary field of engineering science that combines the biological, chemical and physical sciences with the field of engineering.  This major traditionally requires the student to take basic engineering classes in fields such as thermodynamics, advanced math, computer modeling and simulation and technical classes in subjects such as statics, mechanics, hydrology, and fluid dynamics. As the student progresses, the upper division elective classes define a specific field of study for the student with a choice in a range of science, technology and engineering related classes.

Difference with related fields

As a recently created program, environmental engineering science has not yet been incorporated into the terminology found among environmentally focused professionals.  In the few engineering colleges that offer this major, the curriculum shares more classes in common with environmental engineering than it does with environmental science.  Typically, EES students follow a similar course curriculum with environmental engineers until their fields diverge during the last year of college.  The majority of the environmental engineering students must take classes designed to connect their knowledge of the environment to modern building materials and construction methods.  This is meant to direct the environmental engineer into a field where they will more than likely assist in building treatment facilities, preparing environmental impact assessments or helping to mitigate air pollution from specific point sources.

Meanwhile, the environmental engineering science student will choose a direction for their career.  From the range of electives they have to choose from, these students can move into a fields such as the design of nuclear storage facilities, bacterial bioreactors or environmental policies. These students combine the practical design background of an engineer with the detailed theory found in many of the biological and physical sciences.

Description at universities

Stanford University
The Civil and Environmental Engineering department at Stanford University provides the following description for their program in Environmental Engineering and Science:
The Environmental Engineering and Science (EES) program focuses on the chemical and biological processes involved in water quality engineering, water and air pollution, remediation and hazardous substance control, human exposure to pollutants, environmental biotechnology, and environmental protection.

UC Berkeley
The College of Engineering at UC Berkeley defines Environmental Engineering Science, including the following:
This is a multidisciplinary field requiring an integration of physical, chemical and biological principles with engineering analysis for environmental protection and restoration. The program incorporates courses from many departments on campus to create a discipline that is rigorously based in science and engineering, while addressing a wide variety of environmental issues. Although an environmental engineering option exists within the civil engineering major, the engineering science curriculum provides a more broadly based foundation in the sciences than is possible in civil engineering

Massachusetts Institute of Technology

At MIT, the major is described in their curriculum, including the following:

The Bachelor of Science in Environmental Engineering Science emphasizes the fundamental physical, chemical, and biological processes necessary for understanding the interactions between man and the environment. Issues considered include the provision of clean and reliable water supplies, flood forecasting and protection, development of renewable and nonrenewable energy sources, causes and implications of climate change, and the impact of human activities on natural cycles

University of Florida
The College of Engineering at UF defines Environmental Engineering Science as follows: 
The broad undergraduate environmental engineering curriculum of EES has earned the department a ranking as a leading undergraduate program. The ABET accredited engineering bachelor's degree is comprehensively based on physical, chemical, and biological principles to solve environmental problems affecting air, land, and water resources. An advising scheme including select faculty, led by the undergraduate coordinator, guides each student through the program.
The program educational objectives of the EES program at the University of Florida are to produce engineering practitioners and graduate students who 3-5 years after graduation:
Continue to learn, develop and apply their knowledge and skills to identify, prevent, and solve environmental problems.
Have careers that benefit society as a result of their educational experiences in science, engineering analysis and design, as well as in their social and cultural studies.
Communicate and work effectively in all work settings including those that are multidisciplinary.

Lower division coursework

Lower division coursework in this field requires the student to take several laboratory-based classes in calculus-based physics, chemistry, biology, programming and analysis.  This is intended to give the student background information in order to introduce them to the engineering fields and to prepare them for more technical information in their upper division coursework.

Upper division coursework

The upper division classes in Environmental Engineering Science prepares the student for work in the fields of engineering and science with coursework in subjects including the following:

Fluid mechanics
Mechanics of materials
Thermodynamics
Environmental engineering
Advanced math and statistics
Geology
Physical, organic and atmospheric chemistry
Biochemistry
Microbiology
Ecology

Electives

Process engineering

On this track, students are introduced to the fundamental reaction mechanisms in the field of chemical and biochemical engineering.

Resource engineering
For this track, students take classes introducing them to ways to conserve natural resources. This can include classes in water chemistry, sanitation, combustion, air pollution and radioactive waste management.

Geoengineering

This examines geoengineering in detail.

Ecology
This prepares the students for using their engineering and scientific knowledge to solve the interactions between plants, animals and the biosphere.

Biology

This includes further education about microbial, molecular and cell biology.  Classes can include cell biology, virology, microbial and plant biology

Policy

This covers in more detail ways the environment can be protected through political means.  This is done by introducing students to qualitative and quantitative tools in classes such as economics, sociology, political science and energy and resources.

Post graduation work

The multidisciplinary approach in Environmental Engineering Science gives the student expertise in technical fields related to their own personal interest.  While some graduates choose to use this major to go to graduate school, students who choose to work often go into the fields of civil and environmental engineering, biotechnology, and research.  However, the less technical math, programming and writing background gives the students opportunities to pursue IT work and technical writing.

See also

Civil engineering
Environmental engineering
Environmental science
Sustainability
Green building
Sustainable engineering

Notes

References

"MIT Course Catalog: Department of Civil and Environmental Engineering." Massachusetts Institute of Technology. <http://web.mit.edu/catalogue/degre.engin.civil.shtml>.

2008-2009 Announcement. Brochure. Berkeley, 2008. Engineering Announcement 2008-2009. University of California, Berkeley. <https://web.archive.org/web/20081203005457/http://coe.berkeley.edu/students/EngAnn08.pdf>.

External links
Engineering Engineering and Science program at Stanford University 
What people go on to do in Engineering Science at UC Berkeley 
Curriculum at University of Florida 
Curriculum at MIT 
Curriculum at University of Illinois 

Engineering disciplines
Civil engineering
 
Environmental science